Newberry Volcano is a large active shield-shaped stratovolcano located about  south of Bend, Oregon, United States,  east of the major crest of the Cascade Range, within the Newberry National Volcanic Monument. Its highest point is Paulina Peak. The largest volcano in the Cascade Volcanic Arc, Newberry has an area of  when its lava flows are taken into account. It was named for the geologist and surgeon John Strong Newberry, who explored central Oregon for the Pacific Railroad Surveys in 1855. The surrounding area has been inhabited by Native American populations for more than 10,000 years.

The volcano contains a large caldera,  in diameter, known as the Newberry Caldera. Within the caldera are two lakes: Paulina Lake and East Lake. The volcano and its vicinity include many pyroclastic cones, lava flows and lava domes; Newberry has more than 400 vents, the most of any volcano in the contiguous United States. Glaciers may have once been present at the volcano, though this remains contested. The area has a dry climate with low precipitation levels and little surface runoff.

The origin of the volcano remains somewhat unclear; while some scientists believe it originated from an independent hotspot, most evidence indicates that it formed from the subduction of the oceanic Juan de Fuca and Gorda tectonic plates under the continental North American Plate. Eruptive activity at Newberry Volcano began about 600,000 years ago and has continued into the Holocene, the last eruption taking place 1,300 years ago. Unlike other shield-shaped volcanoes, which often erupt basaltic lavas only, Newberry Volcano has also erupted andesitic and rhyolitic lavas. A popular destination for hiking, fishing, boating, and other recreational activities, the volcano lies within  of 16,400 people and within  of nearly 200,000 people, and it continues to pose a threat to life. Still considered an active volcano, it could erupt and produce lava flows, pyroclastic flows, lahars (volcanically induced mudslides, landslides, and debris flows), ashfall, earthquakes, avalanches, and floods. To track this threat, the volcano and its surroundings are closely monitored with sensors by the United States Geological Survey.

Geography 

Because of its enormous size and topographic prominence, it is often confused for an entire mountain range.

Newberry Volcano has an extremely dry climate due to its location in the rain shadow of the Cascade Range. Only one stream appears on Newberry's entire surface, and it remains unclear whether the volcano has ever been able to support glaciers on its slopes, since the mountain lacks cirques (amphitheater-like valleys formed by glacial erosion) or evidence of contact between lava and ice. However, displaced glacial erratics have been found far from their native areas, moraine sediment has been deposited on the eastern and northeastern slopes of the volcano, and the mountain's various cone features have "boat" shapes that indicate glacial alteration. The precise history of glaciers on the volcano is debated, but dry channels and dry waterfalls on the eastern and western slopes are evidence that the volcano once held water.

The volcano has two crater lakes, Paulina Lake and East Lake, which are filled by precipitation and percolation of ground water. The lakes have historically flooded channels surrounding the volcano. A large flood between 4,000 and 2,300 years ago released up to 12,000 acre feet (0.0148 km3) in volume from Paulina Lake, filling the valley floor above the Paulina Prairie, which surrounds the lake. It was possibly caused by the failure of a rock ledge  in height, rather than eruptive activity. Another flood took place in 1909 on the Deschutes River downstream from where it meets its tributary the Little Deschutes River.

Ecology 

The Newberry National Volcanic Monument forms part of the northern section of the Mazama Ecological Province, which has soil comprised by aeolian pumice and volcanic products over basalt bedrock. Flora within the Newberry Volcano area includes forests of juniper, whitebark pine, ponderosa pine (including Oregon's largest ponderosa pine tree), lodgepole pine, jack pine, and white fir, in addition to other plants like Indian paintbrush, purple penstemon, bitterbrush, manzanita, and snowbrush. Infestations by mountain pine beetles have killed many lodgepole pines in the area. Animals near Newberry Volcano include burrowing owls, kangaroo rats, lizards, bats, rattlesnakes, eagles, porcupines, otters, bobcats, mule deer, Roosevelt elk, ducks, and American pika.

Lava flows from Newberry display varied vegetation cover, and there are variable levels of flora between flows, though the level of vegetation and species diversity generally increase with elevation. Dominant plant species on lava flows include oceanspray and wax currant, with rabbitbrush also common. Though forbs are not widespread on the lava flows, where they do occur Davidson's penstemon and hotrock penstemon dominate. All lava flows support patches of grasses such as Idaho fescue, especially on north-facing slopes. One lava flow at Lava Butte is barren except for scattered, dense patches of greenleaf manzanita.

The Lava Cast Forest is a group of trees molded by lava from an eruption 6,000 years ago. Today, the surrounding site lies within the Newberry National Volcanic Monument and includes 11 kīpukas, plots of land surrounded by one or more younger lava flows. Consisting of pure and mixed forest stands, these forests include ponderosa pine, lodgepole pine, and grand fir/white fir hybrid trees, which are supported by young soils derived from Mazama pumice.

Geology 

Overlapping with the northwestern corner of the Basin and Range Province, also known as the High Lava Plains, Newberry Volcano lies within a Cenozoic highland marked by normal faults known as the Brothers Fault Zone. It is situated at the intersection of the Brothers Fault Zone with the north–northwest-trending Sisters and northeast-trending Walker Rim fault zones. In the mantle under Newberry Volcano, P and S seismic waves exhibit an unusually low wave velocity.

The oldest rocks in this region include silicic (rich in silica) lava domes from the late Miocene or early Pliocene, which lie near the province's eastern and southern borders, respectively. Volcanism in this area suggests a progression of silicic eruptions, known as the Newberry Trend, that moves in a northwest-trending direction from the Harney Basin to Newberry Volcano and the rest of the Cascade Range. Newberry Volcano's origins are somewhat controversial; some scientists think it originated from an independent hotspot, but overwhelming evidence suggests that it is part of the Cascades Arc and was produced by the subduction of the oceanic Juan de Fuca and Gorda tectonic plates under the continental North American Plate. However, Newberry Volcano has been transformed by tectonic processes, possibly related to subductive mechanisms that enhance melting of the Juan de Fuca tectonic plate. The High Lava Plains Trend, or the Newberry Trend, moves at an oblique angle to the underlying North American tectonic plate, for which subduction counterflow, gravitational flow along the lithosphere's base, faulting, and extension of the Basin and Range Province have all been proposed as possible mechanisms. At Newberry, the subducting plate has a depth that is  shallower than elsewhere in the major crest of the Cascades, accounting for its unique magmas. Newberry Volcano is likely fed by a magma chamber  under the large, cauldron-like caldera at its summit.

Newberry Volcano first formed about 600,000 years ago and has since been built up by several thousand eruptions. The caldera-forming event occurred about 75,000 years ago from a major explosive eruption.

As a result of its caldera-forming eruption, Newberry has a horizontal profile, which is typical of a shield volcano. However, it is also considered a composite volcano, made up of a matrix of lava flows and pyroclastic deposits. Unlike more typical composite volcanoes in the Cascades, it formed from several eruption types including more traditional explosive eruptions and more fluid effusive events; thus it is usually classified as a "shield-shaped composite volcano", or shield-shaped stratovolcano. This caldera, known as the Newberry Crater, is forested, with small parts of its surface covered with lava flows and pumice deposits. Before the caldera's creation, the mountain's summit was  greater in height than its current elevation. Throughout this progression, the volcano shifted from rhyodacitic pumice to basaltic ash flows, the latter producing the Black Lapilli tuff that covers the western side of the volcano. Since the last caldera-forming eruption 80,000 years ago, the volcano has undergone silicic eruptions at the caldera and produced basaltic and basaltic andesite lava flows that extended down its outer flanks. The tephra and ash from the Black Lapilli tuff by the caldera formed agglutinates around its rim. Newberry Volcano is cut by several fault scarps, small step offsets on the ground surface where one side of a fault has moved vertically with respect to the other.

With a broad, flat top, it formed during an explosive eruption about 7,000 years ago, and sits in the center of the caldera.

Compositionally, lava from the Newberry Volcano has varied from primitive basalts with high magnesium levels to more evolved tholeiitic and calc-alkaline deposits (based on the major element characteristics of the lavas). Primitive lavas exhibit high abundances of chromium and nickel as well as variable concentrations of fluid-mobile elements like barium and strontium. Tholeiitic and calc-alkaline lavas display overlap in magnesium, calcium oxide, and aluminum oxide levels but differ in that the tholeiites have lower contents of silica and potassium oxide and higher iron(II) oxide, titanium dioxide, and sodium oxide. There is also much overlap in isotopic composition, though the tholeiitic lavas mark the low point for 87Sr/86Sr and the high point for 143Nd/144Nd and 176Hf/177Hf. Examination of Newberry lavas with olivine-plagioclase hygrometry shows that tholeiites are anhydrous (less than ) and thus distinct from calc-alkaline deposits; both have different fractional crystallization sequences that derive from primitive magmas, which had their compositions influenced by equilibrium with peridotite in the mantle. By volume, basaltic andesite is the principal lava type at Newberry Volcano, with large volumes of silicic lava among older ash flow tuff deposits.

Subfeatures 

Vents at the volcano follow north-east and north-west trends influenced by extension of the Basin and Range Province. With more than 400 vents, Newberry has more individual subfeatures than any other volcano in the contiguous United States. These include cinder cones, lava domes, and various other lava edifices, with at least 25 vents on the volcano's flanks and summits becoming active within the past 10,000 years. Basaltic and basaltic andesite lava flows have penetrated the bases of many of these cinder cones, forming a matrix of connected flows, and a veneer of pāhoehoe and ʻaʻā lavas can be found on Newberry volcano's northern and southern sides. The northern flank holds three distinct lava tube systems that formed out of pāhoehoe lava: the Horse Lava Tube System (also known as the Horse System), Arnold Lava Tube System, and the Lava Top Butte basalt.

It has pāhoehoe lava throughout its surface, with tumuli (mounds of earth and stones) and a pit crater.

Dacite and rhyodacite domes can be found on the middle and upper flanks, and Newberry also features twenty rhyolitic lava domes and lava flows among its western, eastern, and southern flanks. These include East Butte and China Hat at the eastern base of the volcano, which date to 850,000 and 780,000 years ago, and therefore predate Newberry. The McKay Butte, found on the volcano's western side, formed 580,000 years ago. Other Holocene eruptions have produced rhyolite lava that remained close to the summit, including Paulina Peak, which has a width of one mile and reaches within  of the wall of the caldera.

Hot springs can be found at Paulina Lake and East Lake, along with one fumarole gas vent at Lost Lake, located near the Big Obsidian lava flow. These discharge gases like water vapor and carbon dioxide and give off a rotten smell, though the composition has few noxious components.

Eruptive history 

During the late Pleistocene, Newberry Volcano produced a number of voluminous lava flows, made of basalt, which originated from several vents on its northern flank and reached the modern areas of Bend and Redmond. They filled canyons that served as precursors for the Deschutes and Crooked rivers–since eroded–and extended tens of miles from the volcano. Lava from the last of these eruptions about 78,000 years ago covered the Bend area, surrounded the Pilot Butte cinder cone, and filled the Deschutes River bed.

In addition to its production of large lava flows, Newberry Volcano has also produced a number of Plinian eruptions similar to the eruption of Vesuvius that destroyed Pompeii and Peléan eruptions like the 1902 explosion of Mount Pelée. These include a number of caldera-forming eruptions, producing ash flow deposits including the Tepee Draw tuff and Black Lapilli tuff, and rising  or more into the stratosphere. Here, it reaches a thickness of one centimeter. Additionally, Newberry has produced multiple, voluminous explosive eruptions, with certain studies estimating up to 60 eruptive events of rhyolite and dacite tephra that reach Idaho, Utah, and northern California. These include the eruption that produced the Paulina Creek tephra between 55,000 and 50,000 years ago, and the eruption from 20,000 years ago responsible for the Wono tephra, which extends into western Nevada and east-central California. As a result of compositional zoning within the magma chamber that feeds the volcano, its ash deposits may show different chemical and mineralogical makeups. The last of these tephra eruptions yielded the Newberry pumice just before 1,300 years ago, reaching several hundred miles to the east.

Between the last Ice Age about 12,000 years ago and 7,700 years ago, the volcano erupted at least 12 times. During three eruptive periods at Newberry over the past 7,500 years, the caldera has seen rhyolitic eruptions from seven individual vents. At about the same time, the Central Pumice cone was produced by eruptions that also formed the Interlake and Game Hut obsidian flows from a vent on the cone's southern flank. An eruption from a fissure zone at East Lake, 3,500 years ago, yielded tephra and formed the East Lake obsidian lava flows.

The volcano underwent its most recent eruptions 1,300 years ago, producing the Big Obsidian flow. A silicic deposit, it is made up of rhyolite and features a number of lava blocks. The eruptions, which were both explosive and effusive, began with a Plinian explosion of pumice and tephra that covered the caldera's eastern half and reached several hundred miles to the east. Because of strong westerly winds, tephra reached as far east as Idaho. This eruption also produced pyroclastic flows that left volcanic bombs in Paulina Lake.

Recent activity and current threats 

Though Newberry Volcano is currently quiet, the United States Geological Survey considers it an active volcano with a "very high" threat level. Hot springs within the caldera remain active, and small earthquakes have occurred within recent local history. Any future eruptions would likely show similar characteristics to eruptions from the past 15,000 years, ranging from effusive production of lava flows to explosive eruptions ejecting pumice and ash. If future lava flows from Newberry Volcano are of comparable size to its late Pleistocene eruptions, they would bury settlements throughout the Central Oregon region. They would also likely destroy segments of U.S. Route 97, disabling transportation in the area, in addition to likely ruining gas pipelines and power lines that extend electricity to California, both of which would be accompanied by serious economic consequences.

Flank lava flows, which would likely be basaltic in origin, might form lava fountains that could scatter cinders and lava for several thousand meters, building cinder cones or initiating forest fires.

However, pyroclastic flows have been rare at Newberry. Tephra from explosive eruptions would short-circuit electric transformers and power lines, clog engine filters, produce clouds that might yield lightning, and pose a hazard to aircraft overhead. It would also pose health hazards because ash particles can irritate eyes, and when ingested, lungs, among other health issues. Because of water from the two crater lakes, eruptions at Newberry Volcano may become more explosive and more likely to produce pyroclastic flows. Moreover, if pyroclastic flows mix with snow or water overflowing from the crater lakes, they could spawn lahars, volcanically induced mudslides, landslides, and debris flows that could devastate the Paulina Creek valley and reach the La Pine valley within 30 minutes. Threats from the volcano pose hazards to about 16,400 people who live within  and more than 180,000 people living within .

In addition to threats from volcanic activity, at least one flood has taken place at Newberry Volcano in the past, though it may not have been a result of eruptive activity. If lava flows from an eruption blocked the Deschutes River, they might generate floods upstream by increasing water level and downstream once the blockage clears. Earthquakes unrelated to volcanic activity also take place in Oregon, though they are usually less than 2.5 on the Richter magnitude scale. Volcanoes can also cause earthquakes reaching magnitudes up to 5 on the Richter scale, which sometimes occur as swarms. These clusters of tremors cause shaking of houses, walls, and windows and can crack plaster or walls in older buildings but rarely cause major damage. Powerful earthquakes close to magnitude 7 would cause damage independently, but they would not cause Newberry Volcano to erupt unless it were already on the verge of activity. Additional threats exist for rockfalls and avalanches.

If Newberry Volcano were to erupt, it should be possible to detect increased seismic activity, while increased production of volcanic gas would likely kill trees near the volcano, which scientists would quickly recognize before notifying emergency management agencies. Before 2011, Newberry was monitored by just one seismic station that had been installed in 1987 and had only detected seven earthquakes within  of the volcano. In 2011, scientists from the Cascades Volcano Observatory installed eight more seismic and deformation monitors in the volcano's vicinity, which has seen the number of detectable earthquakes rise to 10–15 per year. The volcano continues to be closely monitored by the United States Geological Survey, which monitors a seismometer network with the geophysics program at the University of Washington and regularly conducts leveling surveys to check for deformation that could suggest impending activity, in addition to sampling geothermal areas. There are GPS instruments installed within the volcano's vicinity to monitor any swelling that occurs as a result of underground movement of magma. Despite historical uplift at the volcano, deformation has remained continuously low in recent years.

Human history 

The area around Newberry Volcano has been inhabited by Native American peoples for more than 10,000 years, though only intermittently as a result of eruptive activity at the volcano and in the surrounding area. Radiocarbon dating of charcoal samples from the site were dated to 11,000 years ago. The mountain's caldera was used to harvest obsidian, which they used to sharpen arrowheads and tools and traded throughout the Pacific Coast region for several thousand years.

The first recorded European to visit the volcano was Peter Skene Ogden, a trapper who reached the crater in 1826. In 1855, the volcano's namesake, John Strong Newberry, a surgeon and geologist for the Williamson and Abbot survey party, visited central Oregon while mapping the local area for the Pacific Railroad, but never visited the volcano. Paulina Lake, Paulina Creek, and Paulina Peak are named after Paulina, a Snake Indian chief who headed raiding parties against whites during the 1850s and 1860s before he was pursued and shot by settler Howard Maupin. Near the end of the 19th century, the Lava River Cave was used by the hunter Leander Dillman to store perishable foods. The name Mount Newberry was proposed by Israel Russell, who visited the area in 1903, though the name did not come into use. Instead, it was known as Newberry Crater until it was renamed to the Newberry Volcano in the 1930s by geologist Howel Williams, a name which was formally accepted in 2003 when geologist Larry Chitwood supported it through the official geographic naming process.

Because of the efforts of Hollis Dole, head of the Oregon Department of Geology, to promote the area, in 1963 NASA scientists became interested in using lava fields at Newberry to prepare for the United States' first moon landing. NASA used the area in October 1964 and July 1966 to geologically train the Apollo Astronauts in recognizing volcanic features, such as cinder and pumice cones, lava flows, ash and obsidian flows, and a lava tube. Astronauts who would use this training on the Moon included Apollo 11's Neil Armstrong and Buzz Aldrin, Apollo 12's Alan Bean, Apollo 14's Edgar Mitchell, Apollo 15's James Irwin, and Apollo 16's Charlie Duke. Notable geologist instructors included Aaron Waters.

The Newberry National Volcanic Monument was established in November 1990 by the United States Congress. The Monument lies within the Deschutes National Forest, which is managed by the United States Forest Service. As of 1997, the caldera area of Newberry holds seven campgrounds, two resort areas, and six summer houses.

Mining and geothermal energy 
Because Newberry has had recent eruptive activity, has remained active for a long time, and has a shallow heat source feeding hot springs, it represents a source of geothermal energy. An investigation conducted by the United States Geological Survey in 1981 drilled a well  in depth at a location to the east of the Big Obsidian flow, finding temperatures of  under the surface there. According to many scientists, Newberry Volcano represents the best geothermal energy candidate in the Pacific Northwest; in 2012, a deep well was built to determine whether water directed into the hole might be heated and returned to the surface in order to yield energy.

Recreation 

Newberry Volcano is visited by 250,000 people each year, who come to go fishing for trout in East Lake, to camp on Paulina Lake, or go mountain biking around the  loop that surrounds the crater. The lakes are also popular for boating. At the Newberry National Volcanic Monument, camping, fishing, and hiking are popular, including on the Trail of the Molten Land, which follows a 7,000-year-old lava flow from Lava Butte, and the Trail of the Whispering Pines, which traverses a ponderosa pine forest.

A shuttle leaves from the center every 20 minutes during the peak season from Memorial Day through Labor Day, costing $2 per traveler. The area can also be accessed by personal motorized vehicles during off season with a permit from the visitor center, and the center's parking area remains open year-round. The area offers eight campgrounds operated by the United States Forest Service.

The last lava flow from Newberry during the Pleistocene formed the Lava River Cave,  to the south of Bend. This trail represents the monument's most popular attraction and can be hiked between May and mid-September with a recreation day pass that costs $5. Jackets are recommended, as the temperature within the cave is usually . The area was designated as the Lava Cast Forest Geological Area in April 1942 by the United States Forest Service, which included  of land in the region. Known to the American public since 1928, by the mid-1940s the Lava Cast Forest was visited by thousands of tourists each year. In the mid-1970s, the region had 150,000 tourist visitors annually, with the Lava Lands Visitors Center built by the Forest Service in September 1975.

The trail to the volcano's summit at Paulina Peak lasts  from Highway 97, with an easy paved road to the caldera and four rest stops, though it grows steep and twisty near the end. The winding trail near the end is made of gravel and lasts for three miles, offering views of Mount Hood, Mount McLoughlin, and the Three Sisters volcanoes.

Notes 
 [b]  At a depth of  under Newberry, p- and s-wave velocities increase, which has been interpreted via tomography as the top of the subducting Juan de Fuca tectonic plate.

References

Sources 

 
 
 
 
 
 
 
 
 
 
 
 
 
 
 
 
 .
 
 .

External links 

 
 
 Database for the Geologic Map of Newberry Volcano, Deschutes, Klamath, and Lake Counties, Oregon – United States Geological Survey

Calderas of Oregon
Cascade Volcanoes
Volcanic crater lakes
Fissure vents
Geology of Oregon
Hotspot volcanoes
Lava domes
Lava tubes
Mountains of Deschutes County, Oregon
Mountains of Klamath County, Oregon
Mountains of Lake County, Oregon
Mountains of Oregon
National Natural Landmarks in Oregon
Newberry National Volcanic Monument
Polygenetic shield volcanoes
Pyroclastic cones
Potentially active volcanoes
Shield volcanoes of the United States
Subduction volcanoes
Volcanoes of Deschutes County, Oregon
Volcanoes of Klamath County, Oregon
Volcanoes of Oregon